Alchevsk Metallurgical Complex is one of the oldest ferrous metallurgy enterprises in eastern Ukraine. Its history dates back to the 1890s, and its founder is Oleksiy Kyrylovych Alchevsky.

It was founded in 1895 as a metallurgical plant of the Donetsko-Yurievske Metallurgical Company.

In 1961-1991 it was called the Kommunarsk Metallurgical Plant, because at that time the city of Alchevsk was called Kommunarsk.

History
From the beginning of the 1890s, on the initiative and financial participation of Oleksiy Alchevsky, two powerful metallurgical enterprises were formed: the Donetsko-Yurievske Metallurgical Company (now the Alchevsk Metallurgical Complex), designed and built by A. Mevius, and together with the Belgians the Russian Providence Company (now Mariupol Metallurgical Plant named after Ilyich).

In 1895, the Metallurgical Plant of Donetsko-Yurievske Metallurgical Company was founded near the Yurievka station (now Kommunarsk) of the Luhansk-Debaltseve railway. The first blast furnace was blown in May 1896. In 1900, the plant employed 3,200 workers.

In 1915, the plant had 5 blast furnaces, 7 open-hearth furnaces, and rolling mills.

The 90's were a rough time for AMC. Beginning in 1997 it underwent bankruptcy proceedings. Until recently, the plant was jointly managed by Interpipe Group and the Industrial Union of Donbas. In 2002, AMC came under the full management of the ISD.

Alchevsk Metallurgical Complex supplies its products to more than 60 countries.

Gallery

Ecology
As of February 22, 2011, the Alchevsk Metallurgical Complex was one of the ten facilities that are the largest polluters in Ukraine.

Russian occupation
Due to the War in eastern Ukraine, in the spring of 2015, the complex ceased its activities.

In December 2017, blast furnace № 5 was launched. Since then, the company has started operating as a branch of ZAO Vneshtorgservis. Finished goods are sold through the Russian company Gas Alliance (or Gaz-Alyans), an intermediary between Vneshtorgservice and end users.

References

Companies established in 1895
Recipients of the Order of the Red Banner of Labour
Steel companies of Ukraine
Alchevsk
1895 establishments in Ukraine